Sakagami (written: 坂上) is a Japanese surname. Notable people with the surname include:

, Japanese writer
, Japanese comedian, actor and singer
, Japanese singer
, Japanese ice hockey player
, Japanese water polo player

Fictional characters
, protagonist of the visual novel Tasogare
, protagonist of the visual novel Gakkou de atta Kowai Hanashi
, a character in the visual novel Clannad

Japanese-language surnames